Terézia Mora (born 5 February 1971) is a Hungarian writer, screenwriter and translator.

Early life and education 
Terézia Mora was born in Sopron, Hungary, to a family with German roots and grew up bilingual. She moved to Germany after the political changes in Hungary in 1990 in order to study Hungarian studies and drama at the Humboldt University in Berlin. Subsequently she trained as a screenwriter at the Deutsche Film- und Fernsehakademie Berlin.

Career 
Mora is working on a trilogy about the IT specialist Darius Kopp, of which band I "The Only Man on the Continent" and Volume II "The Monster" have already appeared.

She is a member of the German PEN Center and the Deutsche Akademie für Sprache und Dichtung, whom she was elected by as a member in 2015.

Since 1990 she has lived in Berlin, working as a freelance writer, writing in German.

Mora is married and has one daughter.

Awards and honours
 1997: Würth Literature Prize for her screenplay The Ways of Water in Erzincan and the Open-Mike-Literary Prize of the Berliner LiteraturWERKstatt for the tale Durst
 1999: Ingeborg Bachmann Prize for the narration Der Fall Ophelia (The case of Ophelia), contained in her first volume of stories Seltsame Materie (Strange Matter)
 2000: Adelbert von Chamisso Prize (promotional prize)
 2001: Island writer on Sylt
 2002: Jane Scraberd Prize of the Heinrich Maria Ledig-Rowohlt Foundation for her translation of Péter Esterházy's Harmonia Caelesti
 2004: Mara Cassens Prize, Prize for the Art Prize of the Academy of Arts (Berlin), Prize of the Leipzig Book Fair for her novel Alle Tage (Category: Fiction)
 2005: Prize of LiteraTour Nord
 2006: Villa Massimo scholarship
 2006/2007: Tübingen Poetry Lecturer together with Péter Esterházy
 2007: Franz Nabl Prize
 2010: Adelbert von Chamisso Prize, Erich Fried Prize
 2011: Translation Prize of the Kunststiftung NRW for her translation by Péter Esterházy's A production novel (two production novels) from the Hungarian and at the same time for her life's work [5]
 2011: "Grenzgänger-Scholarship" by the Robert Bosch Foundation for research on The Monster2013: German Book Prize for The Monster
 October 2013: German Book Prize for her novel Das Ungeheuer
 2013/2014: Frankfurt Poetics Lecturer
 2017: Bremen Literature Prize for Love Among Aliens
 2017: Preis der Literaturhäuser
 2017: Solothurner Literaturpreis
 2018: Roswitha Prize
 2018: Georg Büchner Prize
 2021: Cross of the Order of Merit of the Federal Republic of Germany

On 3 July 2018, it was announced by the German Academy for Language and Literature that she will be presented the Georg Büchner Prize, one of Germany's highest literary honors, at a ceremony in October 2018. The prize comes with an award of 50,000 euros.

Works

Prose 

 Strange matter, Rowohlt Verlag, Reinbek 1999, 
 Alle Tage, Luchterhand Literaturverlag, Munich 2004, 
 The only man on the continent, Luchterhand Literaturverlag, Munich 2009, 
 The monster, Luchterhand Literaturverlag, Munich 2013, 
 Love among aliens, narratives. Luchterhand Literaturverlag, Munich 2016,

Poetry lectures 

 Do not die, Luchterhand Literaturverlag, Munich 2015, 
 The secret text. Salzburger Stefan branch Poetikvorlesung, special number publishing house, Vienna 2016,

Screenplays 

 The Ways of Water in Erzincan, feature film, 30 min. (1998)
 Boomtown / End of the City, feature film, 30 min. (1999)
 The Alibi, screenplay for a thriller shown in German TV, 90 min. (2000)

Plays 

 Something like that (2003)

Audiobooks 

 Miss June Ruby (2005)

Essays 

 About the drastic, in: BELLA triste No. 16 (2006)

Translations 
 Als nur die Tiere lebten (2014), translation of Amikor még csak az állatok éltek, (2012), by Zsófia Bán.
 Abendschule – Ein Fibel für Erwachsene (2012), translation of Esti iskola – Olvasókönyv felnőtteknek, (2007), by Zsófia Bán

References

External links 
 
 Terézia Mora

20th-century Hungarian novelists
Hungarian writers in German
1971 births
Living people
Ingeborg Bachmann Prize winners
Members of the Academy of Arts, Berlin
20th-century Hungarian women writers
German Book Prize winners
Georg Büchner Prize winners
21st-century Hungarian novelists
21st-century Hungarian women writers
Hungarian women novelists
Hungarian screenwriters
Hungarian essayists
Recipients of the Cross of the Order of Merit of the Federal Republic of Germany